The yellow-bellied sea snake (Hydrophis platurus) is a  venomous species of snake from the subfamily Hydrophiinae (the sea snakes) found in tropical oceanic waters around the world except for the Atlantic Ocean.  For many years, it was placed in the  monotypic genus Pelamis, but recent molecular evidence indicates it lies within the genus Hydrophis.

Taxonomy
In 1766, Linnaeus published the original description of the yellow-bellied sea snake, naming it Anguis platura (Anguis meaning snake). In 1803, François Marie Daudin created the new genus Pelamis and assigned this species to it, referring to it as Pelamis platuros. In 1842, Gray described what he thought was a new species and called it Pelamis ornata (subsequently P. ornata became a synonym of P. platura). The commonly used genus name Pelamis is derived from the Ancient Greek word for "tunny fish", which presumably refers to the habitat or what Daudin thought they ate. The specific name platurus is a combination of the Ancient Greek words platys "flat" and oura "tail", referring to the flattened tail. The word Pelamis is a feminine noun and means young or small tunny fish. In 1872, Stoliczka introduced the name Pelamis platurus (still the most used scientific name by scientists today), but used the incorrect ending -us instead of -a which a feminine noun requires. A few recent examples exist of scientists' beginning to use the grammatically correct name Pelamis platura, e.g., Bohme 2003 and the Reptile Database with its page headed Pelamis platura (Linnaeus, 1766), which includes an extensive synonymy of the different scientific names which have been used for the yellow-bellied sea snake. The same rules apply for the most recent taxonomic name of Hydrophis platurus.

To further complicate the nomenclature, the taxonomic status of sea snakes is still under review, with recent authors suggesting a dismantling of monotypic genera, such as Pelamis, in favour of a single genus, Hydrophis, in order to reduce paraphyly and better reflect phylogenetic relationships.

Other common names are yellowbelly sea snake or pelagic sea snake.

Evolution
Sea snakes are a monophyletic group (Hydrophiinae) that diverged from the front-fanged Australasian venomous snakes (Elapidae) about 10 million years ago. The yellow-bellied sea snake is a part of the rapidly radiating Hydrophis group.

Description
The yellow-bellied sea snake, as the name implies, has a distinctive bicolor pattern with a yellow underbelly and brown back, making it easily distinguishable from other sea snake species. Yellow-bellied sea snakes, like many other species of sea snake, are fully adapted to living their whole lives at sea: mating, eating and giving birth to live young (ovoviviparous). Adaptations to aquatic life include the reduced ventral scale size, laterally compressed body and paddle-tail for swimming, valved nostrils and palatine seal for excluding seawater, and cutaneous gas exchange for prolonging dive times. This species can uptake up to 33% of its oxygen requirements through the skin while diving and swimming at the surface of the water. Sea snakes also have a special salt gland located in the lower jaw that was formerly believed to filter out salt from the surrounding seawater  but has been found not to be used for that purpose, as sea snakes drink fresh water only.
See snake scales for terminology used here

Morphology 
The body of this snake is compressed, with the posterior less than half the diameter of the neck; the body scales are juxtaposed, subquadrangular in shape, and in 23–47 rows around the thickest part of the body; ventral scales, 264–406 in number, are very small and, if distinct, divided by a latitudinal
groove, but usually are indistinguishable from adjacent body scales. The head is narrow, with an elongated snout; head shields are entire, nostrils are superior, and nasal shields are in contact with one another; the prefrontal scale is in contact with second upper labial; one or two preoculars, two or three postoculars, and two or three small anterior temporals are present; seven or eight upper labials are found, with four or five below the eye, but separated from the border by a subocular. Colors of the snake are variable, but most often distinctly bicolored, black above, yellow or brown below, with the dorsal and ventral colors sharply demarcated from one another; ventrally, there may be a series of black spots or bars on the yellow or brown background, or the yellow may extend dorsally so there is only a narrow middorsal black stripe, or a series of black crossbars.

Distribution and habitat
The yellow-bellied sea snake is one of the most widely distributed snakes in the world. It is completely pelagic and is often observed on oceanic drift lines, using surface currents and storms to move around the ocean. Their distribution appears to be largely determined by favourable water temperatures, oceanic currents and recent formation of land bridges that have blocked farther dispersal.

The yellow-bellied sea snake has an extensive distribution covering the entire tropical Indo-Pacific, as well as extending to Costa Rica, southern California, and northern Peru. It is the only sea snake to have reached the Hawaiian Islands. The favoured habitat for hunting and reproduction includes free floating mats of sea kelp occurring in the Indian Ocean. The species is the most commonly beached sea snake on the coast of Southwest Australia, including records at beaches near metropolitan areas. It is also reported from Christmas Island and Cocos (Keeling) Islands (Australia).

The sea snake has also been reported in colder waters such as the coasts of southern California, Tasmania, and New Zealand, a country that would otherwise be free of snakes were it not for the infrequent visits of yellow-bellied sea snake and banded sea kraits. Though rare, the yellow-bellied sea snake is the most commonly seen sea snake in New Zealand waters, to the degree that the species can be considered indigenous to New Zealand and protected under the Wildlife Act 1953. These cold water occurrences are believed to be linked with el Niño events or severe storms. They require a minimum of 16–18 °C (60.8 to 64.4 °F) to survive long term. In October 2015, they were reported and photographed on beaches in Ventura County, California, well outside their normal range, for the first time in 30 years.

The yellow-bellied sea snake is the only sea snake to have been found in the Atlantic Ocean, although only in limited circumstances. The yellow-bellied sea snake's occurrence into the Atlantic is not considered a part of its native range, but rather a dispersal from its native Pacific range.

The yellow-bellied sea snake has been found in all the countries of Africa's eastern coast and all eastern islands, like Djibouti, Eritrea, Kenya, Madagascar, Mauritius, Mayotte, Mozambique, Réunion, Seychelles, Somalia, South Africa and Tanzania. On the African Atlantic coast they have been reported to occur in the Benguela Current, with specimens found along the coasts of South Africa and Namibia.

The yellow-bellied sea snake has also been found in the Colombian Caribbean four separate times, making it the only sea snake to be found in the Caribbean Sea. However these occurrences are believed to be the result of human activity, be it ship discharge, intentional release or via the Panama Canal, as it is not considered a part of their native range. This is due to the land bridge between North and South America (Isthmus of Panama), which formed from about 10 million years ago to 3 million years ago (i.e., continental drift), acting as a dispersal barrier and preventing entry into the Caribbean Sea from the Pacific Ocean. The man-made Panama Canal has not made a crossing of the isthmus possible presumably because it is fresh water.

Due to the wide distribution of the species and relative lack of dispersal barriers, it has been assumed that individuals from different localities represent a single breeding population (i.e., high gene flow). However, a study that used haplotype networks in two populations from Costa Rica suggests that shallow genetic population structure exists, which reflects variation in colour patterns (brown and yellow in Golfo de Papagayo and completely yellow in Golfo Dulce).

Behaviour
Contrary to past beliefs, sea snakes require fresh water to survive and the yellow-bellied sea snake drinks precipitation that forms on the surface of sea water. This species has been reported to survive severe dehydration of up to 7 months during seasonal drought.

Yellow-bellied sea snakes breed in warm waters; they are ovoviviparous with a gestation period around 6 months. According to Ditmars, females bear live young in tidal pools. They move poorly on land due to their smaller belly scales that form a ventral keel. They are sometimes observed in large aggregations of thousands on the surface of the water in oceanic drift lines, which has been proposed as a strategy to catch prey. They hunt by floating on the surface of the water to attract pelagic fish that are seeking shelter; prey are captured via a backwards swimming motion and rapid lunge of the jaws. The ability to swim backwards is an unusual and distinguishing characteristic of this species. Heatwole proposed that these snakes find their prey by sensing the vibration generated by fish movement.

Venom
The venom of this species is highly potent, like that of other sea snakes. The subcutaneous  of the venom is 0.067 mg/kg and the venom yield per bite is 1.0–4.0 mg. Yellow-bellied sea snake venom contains several different neurotoxins and two other isotoxins.

Antivenom
Sea snake venom can cause damage to skeletal muscle with consequent myoglobinuria, neuromuscular paralysis or direct renal damage. The venoms of significant species of sea snake are neutralised with Commonwealth Serum Laboratories Ltd (of Melbourne, Australia) sea snake (Enhydrina schistosa) antivenom. If that preparation is not available, tiger snake or polyvalent antivenom should be used. No deaths have been recorded from bites in Australian waters. The E. schistosa antivenom was tested specifically on Pelamus platurus, and it effectively neutralised the venom.

Cited references

Other sources
 Ditmars, R.L. 1936. The Reptiles of North America. Doubleday, Doran & Co. New York. 476 pp.
 
 Kropach, C. 1975 The yellow-bellied sea snake, Pelamis, in the eastern Pacific. pp. 185–213 in: Dunson, W., ed., The Biology of Sea Snakes. Univ. Park Press, Baltimore, xi + 530 pp.
 Smith, M.A. 1943. The Fauna of British India, Ceylon and Burma, including the Whole of the Indo-Chinese Sub-region. Reptiles and Amphibians. Vol. III. – Serpentes. Taylor & Francis. London. 583 pp.

External links
 Pelagic Sea Snakes and the animals that live on them, Life is Short but Snakes are Long

Reptiles described in 1766
Taxa named by Carl Linnaeus
Hydrophis
Reptiles of Pakistan
Reptiles of New Zealand
Reptiles of Western Australia
Reptiles of Japan
Reptiles of Mexico
Reptiles of Iran
Reptiles of Guatemala
Reptiles of Hawaii
Snakes of Australia